Annals are a concise form of historical writing which record events chronologically, year by year. The equivalent word in Latin and French is annales, which is used untranslated in English in various contexts.

List of works with titles containing the word "Annales"
Annales (Ennius), an epic poem by Quintus Ennius covering Roman history from the fall of Troy down to the censorship of Cato the Elder
 Annals (Tacitus) Ab excessu divi Augusti "Following the death of the divine Augustus"
 Annales Alamannici, ed. W. Lendi, Untersuchungen zur frühalemannischen Annalistik. Die Murbacher Annalen, mit Edition (Freiburg, 1971)
 Annales Bertiniani, eds.
 Annales du Muséum national d'histoire naturelle, Paris, France. Published 1802 to 1813, then became the Mémoires then the Nouvelles Annales
 Annales Fuldenses, ed. F. Kurze, Monumenta Germaniae Historica SRG (Hanover, 1891)
 Annales. Histoire, Sciences Sociales, a French academic journal covering social history
 Annales regni Francorum, ed. F. Kurze, MGH SRG (Hanover, 1895)
 Annales Iuvavenses, ed. H. Bresslau, MGH SS (vol. 30, Hanover, 1926), pp. 727–44
 Annales Vedastini, ed. B. vonSimson
 Annales Xantenses et Annales Vedastini, MGH SRG (Hanover, 1909)
 Annales of Granius Licinianus

Journal and school
 Annales School, a school of historical writing named after its journal, the Annales d'histoire économique et sociale

See also
Annals